John Meehan may refer to:

 John Meehan (Australian politician) (1864–1930), Irish-born Australian politician
 John Meehan (screenwriter) (1890–1954), Canadian screenwriter
 John Meehan (art director) (1902–1963), American art director and production designer
 John Meehan (dancer) (born 1950), Australian dancer and ballet director
 John Meehan (priest), Canadian Jesuit priest and university president
 John Silva Meehan (1790–1863), American printer and publisher
 Chick Meehan (John Francis Meehan, 1893–1972), American football player and coach
 Chick Meehan (basketball) (John Dennis Meehan, 1917–2004), American basketball player
 Dirty John, a podcast about "Dirty John" Meehan, an American criminal
 Dirty John (TV series), an American television series based on the podcast about "Dirty John" Meehan, an American criminal

See also 
 Meehan (disambiguation)